Rinku Singh may refer to:
Rinku Singh (cricketer)
Rinku Singh Rahi
Rinku Singh (baseball), former baseball player and current wrestler for the NXT brand of WWE